Adolph Proskauer (1838 – 1900) was a Jewish officer in the army of the Confederate States of America during the United States Civil War. He rose to the rank of major.

Major Adolph Proskauer of Mobile, Alabama was wounded several times. A subordinate officer
wrote "I can see him now as he nobly carried himself at Gettysburg, standing coolly and calmly
with a cigar in his mouth at the head of the 12th Alabama amid a perfect rain of bullets, shot and
shell. He was the personification of intrepid gallantry and imperturbable courage.

His nephew was Joseph M. Proskauer a prominent New York attorney, Judge, and founding partner of the law firm Proskauer Rose.

References 

Jewish American military personnel
American people of German-Jewish descent
Foreign Confederate military personnel
Confederate States Army officers
German emigrants to the United States
Jews and Judaism in St. Louis
Jewish Confederates
Military personnel from St. Louis
1900 deaths
1838 births